Dustin Michael Coleman (born April 20, 1987) is an American former professional baseball infielder. He previously played in Major League Baseball (MLB) for the Kansas City Royals and San Diego Padres.

Amateur career

Born in Sioux Falls, South Dakota, Coleman attended O'Gorman Catholic High School in Sioux Falls, where he played for the school's baseball team. He was named an all-state shortstop his junior and senior seasons, and went on to play baseball at Wichita State University. In 2008, he played collegiate summer baseball in the Cape Cod Baseball League for the Bourne Braves, and was named a league all-star. He was drafted by the Oakland Athletics in the 28th round of the 2008 Major League Baseball Draft.

Professional career

Oakland Athletics
In 2014, playing in AA and batting .223/.300/.397 with 18 home runs, he led all minor leaguers with 500 or more plate appearances with a strikeout percentage of 36.5%.

Kansas City Royals
Coleman signed with the Kansas City Royals as a free agent before the 2015 season, and was called up to the majors for the first time on July 3, 2015. He appeared in four games for the Royals, and was designated for assignment on September 7.

San Diego Padres
During the 2016 offseason, Coleman signed with the San Diego Padres, and appeared in 27 games for the Padres in 2017, hitting 4 home runs in 66 at-bats. He elected free agency on October 2. On November 16, 2017, Coleman resigned with the Padres on a minor league deal. He elected free agency on November 2, 2018.

References

External links

1987 births
Living people
American expatriate baseball players in Canada
Arizona League Athletics players
Arizona League Royals players
Baseball players from South Dakota
Bourne Braves players
El Paso Chihuahuas players
Kane County Cougars players
Kansas City Royals players
Major League Baseball infielders
Midland RockHounds players
Northwest Arkansas Naturals players
Omaha Storm Chasers players
Phoenix Desert Dogs players
Sacramento River Cats players
San Diego Padres players
Sportspeople from Sioux Falls, South Dakota
Stockton Ports players
Vancouver Canadians players
Wichita State Shockers baseball players